Corey Wagner (born 23 March 1997) is a professional Australian rules footballer who plays for Fremantle, having previously played for North Melbourne and Melbourne in the Australian Football League (AFL). He is the younger brother of former Melbourne defender, Josh Wagner. He was drafted by the North Melbourne Football Club with their fourth selection and forty-first overall in the 2015 national draft. He made his debut in the nine point loss against Hawthorn in round 13, 2016 at Etihad Stadium.

Wagner was delisted at the conclusion of the 2017 AFL season.

Ahead of the 2019 season, Wagner joined Melbourne during the newly implemented pre-season supplemental selection period.

Wagner was delisted from Melbourne at the end of the 2020 AFL season.

Statistics
 Statistics are correct to the end of 2019

|- style="background-color: #EAEAEA"
! scope="row" style="text-align:center" | 2016
|
| 41 || 4 || 0 || 1 || 14 || 14 || 28 || 6 || 16 || 0.0 || 0.3 || 3.5 || 3.5 || 7.0 || 1.5 || 4.0
|-
! scope="row" style="text-align:center" | 2017
|
| 41 || 4 || 0 || 2 || 18 || 13 || 31 || 6 || 6 || 0.0 || 0.5 || 4.5 || 3.3 || 7.8 || 1.5 || 1.5
|- style="background-color: #EAEAEA"
! scope="row" style="text-align:center" | 2019
|
| 40 || 11 || 6 || 5 || 72 || 50 || 122 || 27 || 45 || 0.5 || 0.5 || 6.5 || 4.5 || 11.1 || 2.5 || 4.1
|- class="sortbottom"
! colspan=3| Career
! 19
! 6
! 8
! 104
! 77
! 181
! 39
! 67
! 0.3
! 0.4
! 5.5
! 4.1
! 9.5
! 2.1
! 3.5
|}

References

External links

1997 births
Living people
North Melbourne Football Club players
Aspley Football Club players
Australian rules footballers from Queensland
Werribee Football Club players
Casey Demons players
Melbourne Football Club players
Port Melbourne Football Club players